Fidelity China Special Situations is a large British investment trust dedicated to long-term investments in Asia. Established in 2010, the company is a constituent of the FTSE 250 Index. The chairman is Nicholas Bull. The fund is managed by Dale Nicholls of Fidelity International.

References

External links
  Official site

Investment trusts of the United Kingdom
Companies listed on the London Stock Exchange